The Archdiocese of Gandhinagar is a Latin Church ecclesiastical jurisdiction or archdiocese of the Catholic Church located in the city of Gandhinagar in India. The archdiocese is a metropolitan see with three suffragan dioceses in its ecclesiastical province.

History
 11 November 2002: Established as the Archdiocese of Gandhinagar from the Diocese of Ahmedabad. Bishop Stanislaus Fernandes, SJ, was named Archbishop. The territory of the new Archdiocese then comprised the districts of Gandhinagar, Mehsana, Patan, Banaskantha and Sabarkantha.

Leadership
 Archbishops of Gandhinagar
 Archbishop Thomas Ignatius MacWan (12 June 2015 – present)
 Archbishop Stanislaus Fernandes, S.J. (11 November 2002 – 12 June 2015)

Suffragan dioceses
 Ahmedabad 
 Baroda
 Rajkot

References

Sources
 Archdiocese of Gandhinagar
 GCatholic.org 
 Catholic Hierarchy 

Roman Catholic dioceses in India
Christian organizations established in 2002
Roman Catholic dioceses and prelatures established in the 21st century
2002 establishments in Gujarat
Christianity in Gujarat
Gandhinagar